Bob Cassidy (born 1949, Kearny, New Jersey – 24 February 2017) was an American mentalist, speaker and author of books in the field, including The Art of Mentalism (1983), The Principia Mentalia (1994), and The Artful Mentalism of Bob Cassidy (2004).

Society
In 1978 Cassidy, and fellow mentalists Tony Raven, Scott Gordon, Mary Lynn, and Dian Buehlmeier, founded the Psychic Entertainers Association, a mentalism international professional society.

Awards
1996 David Lederman Memorial Award for Creativity in Mentalism

2011 Dunninger Memorial Award for Distinguished Professionalism in the Performance of Mentalism

Books
Pseudo-Mentally Yours (1977)
The Art of Mentalism (1983)
Principia Mentalia, Vol. 1 & 2 (1996)
The Art of Mentalism, Vol. 2 (1996)

References

External links
Video clips of Bob Cassidy in performance
His author page

1949 births
Living people
Mentalists
People from Kearny, New Jersey